The 42nd Expeditionary Airlift Squadron, sometimes written as 42d Expeditionary Airlift Squadron, is a provisional unit of the United States Air Force, assigned to United States Air Forces in Europe to activate or inactivate as needed. Originally constituted as the 42nd Transport Squadron in 1942 and redesignated the 42nd Troop Carrier Squadron the same year, it received its present designation in 2007. It was last active at Ramstein Air Base, Germany in 2009.

History

World War II

The squadron was first activated at Elmendorf Field, Alaska in May 1942.  The 42d transported personnel and supplies to the Aleutian Islands until February 1944.

As combat operations diminished, the squadron departed Alaska with the air echelon leaving on 11 February 1944 and the ground echelon following a week later.  The squadron was reunited at Lawson Field, Georgia on 6 March to serve as a Replacement Training Unit (RTU). RTUs were oversized units which trained aircrews prior to their deployment to combat theaters. The squadron also began to participate in exercises with the parachute school at Fort Benning.

However, the Army Air Forces found that standard military units, based on relatively inflexible tables of organization, were proving less well adapted to the training mission.  Accordingly, it adopted a more functional system in which each base was organized into a separate numbered unit, while the groups and squadrons acting as RTUs were disbanded or inactivated. As a result, one month after the squadron arrived in Georgia, in April 1944, it was disbanded and its personnel and equipment were transferred to the 811th AAF Base Unit (Parachute Flight Training).

Special Operations

The squadron was reactivated as a "Special" troop carrier squadron at RAF Molesworth in fall 1956, when it absorbed the personnel, SA-16 and C-119F aircraft and special operations mission of the 582d Air Resupply Group.  In the spring of 1957, as United States Air Forces in Europe (USAFE) was preparing to wind down operations at Molesworth, the squadron moved to RAF Alconbury, where it was inactivated in December.  The squadron's Douglas C-54 Skymasters and Douglas C-47 Skytrains were sent to Rhein-Main Air Base West Germany, and its Fairchild C-119 Flying Boxcars were sent to the 322d Air Division at Evreux-Fauville Air Base France.

Provisional squadron
It was reformed as the 42d Expeditionary Airlift Squadron in 2007 and allotted to USAFE to activate as needed for operations.  USAFE activated the squadron from 2008 to 2009 to fly missions in the United States Africa Command area.

Lineage
 Constituted as the 42d Transport Squadron on 17 April 1942
 Activated on 2 May 1942
 Redesignated 42d Troop Carrier Squadron on 5 July 1942
 Disbanded on 14 April 1944
 Reconstituted on 6 February 1956 and redesignated 42d Troop Carrier Squadron, Medium (Special)
 Activated on 25 October 1956
 Inactivated on 8 December 1957
 Redesignated 42d Expeditionary Airlift Squadron on 6 November 2007 and allotted to United States Air Forces in Europe to activate or inactivate as needed
 Activated on 1 October 2008
 Inactivated on 15 June 2009

Assignments
 Eleventh Air Force: 2 May 1942 (attached to XI Air Force Service Command [Provisional]) after 21 June 1942)
 XI Air Force Service Command: 8 August 1942 (attached to 11th Air Force Troop Carrier Group [Provisional]) after 1 July 1943)
 60th Troop Carrier Wing: 6 March 1944 – 14 April 1944
 Third Air Force: 25 October 1956 – 8 December 1957
 404th Air Expeditionary Group: 1 October 2008 – 15 June 2009

Stations
 Elmendorf Field, Alaska, 2 May 1942
 Lawson Field, Georgia, 6 March 1944 – 14 April 1944
 RAF Molesworth, England, 25 October 1956
 RAF Alconbury, England, 31 May 1957 – 8 December 1957
 Ramstein Air Base, Germany 1 October 2008 – 15 June 2009

Aircraft

 Douglas C-47 Skytrain (1942–1944)
 Douglas C-53 Skytrooper (1944)
 Fairchild C-119 Flying Boxcar (1956–1957)
 Douglas C-54 Skymaster (1956–1957)
 Grumman SA-16 Albatross (1956–1957)
 Lockheed C-130 Hercules (2008–2009)

See also

 List of United States Air Force airlift squadrons
 List of C-130 Hercules operators

References

Notes

Bibliography

 
 
 
 

Air expeditionary squadrons of the United States Air Force
042
Military units and formations of the United States in the Cold War